Theosophy in Scandinavia is represented by many independent lodges.

The independent Theosophy in Scandinavia began in 1989 when the Danish section of the TS Adyar became independent from the TS Adyar. The members then founded an independent Theosophical Union. In 2004 ten autonomous theosophical lodges founded the "Theosophical Network".

About 1890 the first theosophical lodges were founded in Scandinavia. When in 1895 the seventh lodge was founded, a "Scandinavian Section" of the TS Adyar with headquarters in Stockholm was established. It was a practice that after seven lodges were founded in one country, a "Section" in that country could be founded. In 1907 the Finnish Section was founded, and in 1921 the Icelandic Section.

In the 1970s the members of the lodges of the Danish Section began to study the works of Alice Bailey. The TS Adyar was opposed to the teachings of Bailey, and this situation led to a crisis, so that the Danish Section left the TS Adyar in 1989 and became independent. Another angle is perhaps the fact that the autobiography by Alice A. Bailey: "The Unfinished Autobiography," written 1945–1948, and published 1951, is very much in opposition to the Theosophical Society and was viewed by TS Adyar as attacking the TS Adyar. Alice A. Bailey was a member of the TS Adyar until year 1939 when she herself stopped her membership, says the TS Adyar archives in USA.

Independent organisations 
The Danish TS voted in August 1989 for the creation of an independent Teosofisk Forening (Theosophical Union). Other lodges were integrated in this organisation. In November 1997 the name was changed to Theosophical Association Scandinavia (TAS). In August 2004 ten theosophical organisations from Denmark and Norway founded in Aarhus the Teosofisk Netværk or Teosofisk Nettverk (Theosophical Network).

Members of the Theosophical Network are:

In Denmark:
 The Golden Circle - Den Gyldne Cirkel) (on Seeland
 Theosophical Association Aalborg - Teosofisk Forening Aalborg)
 Theosophical Association Aarhus - Teosofisk Forening Århus)
 Theosophical Association Frederikshavn - Teosofisk Forening Frederikshavn
 Theosophical Association Fyn - Teosofisk Forening Fyn
 Theosophical Association Copenhagen - Teosofisk Forening København
 Theosophical Association Naestved - Teosofisk Forening Næstved
In Norway:
 Theosophical Association Stavanger - Teosofisk Forening Stavanger
 Theosophical Association Telemark/Vestfold - Teosofisk Forening Telemark/Vestfold
 Theosophical Center Oslo - Teosofisk Senter Oslo

There are also other theosophical organisations in Scandinavia that are not part of the Network.

Some members of independent theosophical organisations in Scandinavia also participated in the World Parliament of Religions in Barcelona in 2004.

The TS Adyar has lodges in Finland, Sweden and Norway, and the TS Pasadena has lodges in Finland and Sweden. The ULT has lodges in Sweden.

References

 A short history of the Icelandic Section

External links

Theosophical Network 
Theosophical Network 
Golden Circle 
Aalborg and Frederikshavn 
Aarhus 
 Fünen 
 Copenhagen 
 Næstved
 Stavanger 
Telemark/Vestfold 
Oslo

Other independent organisations 
Esoteric Center Scandinavia 
Sophia Undervisning 
Teosofisk Fellowship 

Religion in Denmark
Religion in Sweden
Religion in Finland
Religion in Iceland
Religion in Norway
Theosophy